Alvalade is a freguesia (civil parish) and district of Lisbon, the capital of Portugal. Located in central Lisbon, Alvalade is south of Lumiar and Olivais, west of Marvila, east of São Domingos de Benfica, and north of Avenidas Novas and Areeiro. The population in 2011 was 31,813.

History

In 1323, the Battle of Alvalade was fought between King Dinis I of Portugal and his son King Afonso IV of Portugal, but famously the battle was stopped after the intervention of Saint Queen Isabel of Portugal, wife of Dinis I and mother of Afonso IV. There is a monument erected in memory of the Saint Queen in Alvalade.

With the 2012 Administrative Reform, the former Campo Grande and São João de Brito parishes merged with the Alvalade parish and the new and larger one kept the latter's name.

Landmarks
Biblioteca Nacional de Portugal
Torre do Tombo National Archive

References

External links
Alvalade heraldry

Parishes of Lisbon